The Greek Guiding Association (ΣΕΟ), formerly known as the Greek Girl Guides Association  (ΣΕΟ), is the national Guiding association of Greece. Guiding in Greece started in 1932 and became a member of the World Association of Girl Guides and Girl Scouts (WAGGGS) in 1933. The coeducational organization has 10,682 members (as of 2008).

History 
The first Guide units were established in 1932, and in 1933, SEO became an associate member of WAGGGS. During World War II the movement fell inactive, but it was revived in 1945. In 1948 it advanced to full membership with WAGGGS.

The association started special groups for girls with disabilities in 1951; since 1995, children with special needs are integrated in all units.

The 1990s saw a general overhaul of the organization's program: the organization opened for boys and a new branch for pre-school-age children was introduced – the Asteria (Stars).

Program and ideals
The association is divided in four age-groups:
 Asteria – Stars (ages 5 to 7)
 Poulia – Birds (ages 7 to 11)
 Odigoi – Guides (ages 11 to 14)
 Megaloi Odigoi/Naftodigoi – Rangers/Sea Rangers (ages 14 to 17)

The troops for each branch have distinct names:
 Galaxias (Galaxy)
 Sminos (Flock)
 Omada (Troop)
 Omada/Pliroma (Troop/Crew)

See also 
 Scouts of Greece
 Olympia Badge

Further reading 
 World Association of Girl Guides and Girl Scouts, World Bureau (1997), Trefoil Round the World. Eleventh Edition 1997.

References 

World Association of Girl Guides and Girl Scouts member organizations
Scouting and Guiding in Greece
Youth organizations established in 1932